Hypochlorosis antipha is a butterfly in the family Lycaenidae. It is found on Maluku, Indonesia and Fergusson Island, Papua New Guinea.

Subspecies
Hypochlorosis antipha antipha (Maluku, Aru Islands)
Hypochlorosis antipha metilia (Fruhstorfer, 1908) (New Guinea: Fergusson Island)

References

, 1977. Butterflies of the Australian Region, edn 2. 415 pp. Melbourne.
, 1908. Neue Lycaeniden des Papua-Gebeits. Internationale Entomologische Zeitschrift 2(18): 114. 
, 1916. Gross-Schmetterlinge der Erde. Die Indo-Australischen Tagfalter. Vol. 9. Stuttgart.
, 1863-1878.  Illustrations of Diurnal Lepidoptera, Lycaenidae. London, van Vorst, x + 229 pp. Text Plates.
, 1998. The Butterflies of Papua New Guinea Academic Press, 

Butterflies described in 1869
Theclinae
Butterflies of Indonesia
Butterflies of Oceania
Taxa named by William Chapman Hewitson